Mangong (1871–1946) or Song Mangong was a Korean Buddhist monk, independence activist, scholar, poet, writer, and philosopher during the Japanese occupation of Korea. Mangong was born in Jeongeup, Jeonbuk Province in 1871 and was ordained at the age of 14. Though he spent three years teaching Zen tradition in Mahayeon Temple in Keumkang Mountain and briefly served as the abbot of Magok Temple, he spent most of his life teaching Zen at Deoksung Mountain in Yesan, Chungnam Province. Mangong revitalized the Zen tradition of Korean Buddhism along with his teacher, Zen Master Kyongho.

See also 
 Korean Buddhism
 Korean Seon
 Kyongho
 Hanam Jungwon
 Jeongang
 Daewon
 Seungsahn
 Jinje
 Han Yong-un
 Chunseong

Gallery

References

Web site 
http://www.ibulgyo.com/news/articleView.html?idxno=63691
http://www.ibulgyo.com/news/articleView.html?idxno=84271
http://www.ibulgyo.com/news/articleView.html?idxno=85495
http://www.ibulgyo.com/news/articleView.html?idxno=90104

1871 births
1946 deaths
20th-century Korean philosophers
Korean Buddhist monks
Korean independence activists
Korean revolutionaries
Korean anti-communists
Korean educators
20th-century Korean poets
Korean writers
Korean male poets
Yeosan Song clan